Candalides hyacinthina, the varied dusky-blue, is a species of butterfly of the family Lycaenidae. It is found along the east coast of Australia, including South Australia, New South Wales, Western Australia and Victoria.

The wingspan is about 40 mm. Adults males have dark bronze wings. Females are also bronze, but have a substantial area with a blue sheen on each wing. The underside of both sexes is fawn with arcs of darker spots and two black spots under the tornus of each forewing.

The larvae have been recorded feeding on the young shoots of Cassytha melantha, Cassytha racemosa and Cassytha peninsularis. They are green with orange patches and are covered in sparse short white hairs. Pupation takes place in a mottled brown pupa with a length of about 13 mm.

Subspecies
C. h. hyacinthina - common dusky blue (southern Queensland to central Victoria, Grampians)
C. h. simplexa (Tepper, 1882) - western dusky blue (north-western Victoria, Southern Australia, Western Australia)
C. h. eugenia Waterhouse & Lyell, 1914 (Queensland (Port Stewart to Yeppoon))
C. h. josephina Harris, 1952 (Stawell)

References

Candalidini
Butterflies described in 1879
Butterflies of Australia
Taxa named by Georg Semper